Gongora irmgardiae is a species of orchid found in Colombia.

References

External links 
 

irmgardiae
Orchids of Colombia